Roller sports competitions at the 2022 South American Games in Asuncion, Paraguay were held between October 1 and 4, 2022 at the Skatepark in the Parque Olímpico  Asunción, SND Arena and Centro Nacional de Patinaje Velocidad

Schedule

Medal summary

Medal table

Medalists

Artistic roller skating

Inline speed skating

Skateboarding

Participation
Ten nations participated in the roller sports events of the 2022 South American Games.

References

Roller sports
South American Games
2022